Hays plc is a British multinational company providing recruitment and human resources services across 33 countries globally. It is listed on the London Stock Exchange and is a constituent of the FTSE 250 Index.

History

The company was founded in 1867 as an operator of wharves and warehouses on the south bank of the River Thames. The name can be traced to Alexander Hay, who acquired a brewhouse there in 1651. It was redeveloped as a 'wharf', in fact an enclosed dock, in 1856 and renamed Hay's Wharf. It was rebuilt after the 1861 Tooley Street fire and still stands; it was converted in the 1980s into a shopping and restaurant area known as Hay's Galleria.

The Kuwait Investment Authority acquired an indirect 34% holding in the company in 1975, increased to 100% in 1980, chiefly to acquire the property assets on the south bank of the Thames, which were sold to St Martins Property Group in the early 1980s.

To develop the management team for the services group, the Kuwaitis backed Hays' acquisition of Farmhouse Securities, a food distribution business owned by Ronnie Frost, and Hays then moved into chemical distribution and office support services with Frost and Peter David Thatcher Roberts as CEO. In 1986, it purchased a personnel business called Career Care Group, which had been founded by Denis Waxman. Hays was also growing its business storage services which included the brands "Hays Wharf" and "Rentacrate". In 1987, a long-planned management buyout was completed, and the company launched an initial public offering in 1989. Ronnie Frost managed the combined services group from 1987 until he retired in 2001.

In March 2003, Hays announced that, following a strategic review, it intended to reposition itself purely as a specialist recruitment business and that the company would dispose of all non-core business, including its commercial and logistics operations. Following Hays' change of focus to a recruitment company, Denis Waxman became CEO in July 2004. In November 2004 Hays de-merged its DX delivery network which represented the final step in the transformation of Hays into a recruitment business. In November 2007 Waxman retired and was succeeded by Alistair Cox.

Current operations
Hays is a specialist recruitment group with operations in the UK and Ireland, Continental Europe (in Germany pronounced Hei(s), as health=Hei(l)), the Americas and Asia Pacific regions. It has a fairly equal balance of work in temporary and permanent recruitment, which contributes to financial stability through business cycles. Hays operates in 33 countries.

Involvement in price-fixing
In 2009 the Office of Fair Trading imposed a £30.4m fine against Hays for its involvement in price-fixing. The firm, along with five other recruitment firms, formed a cartel called the Construction Recruitment Forum which agreed to boycott Parc, a new company that had entered the market in 2003 to act as an intermediary between construction firms and recruitment firms. The six firms received fines totalling £39.3m, Hays receiving the biggest fine. Hays had its fine cut by the Competition Appeal Tribunal from £30.4m to £5.9m following an appeal against the level of a fine imposed by the Office of Fair Trading in September 2009.

References

External links
 

Companies based in the London Borough of Camden
Consulting firms established in 1867
Employment agencies of the United Kingdom
English brands
Companies listed on the London Stock Exchange
Human resource management consulting firms